Thomas Whitten Slick (July 5, 1869 – January 3, 1959) was a United States district judge of the United States District Court for the District of Indiana and the United States District Court for the Northern District of Indiana.

Education and career

Born in South Bend, Indiana, Slick received a Bachelor of Laws from the University of Michigan Law School in 1893. He was in private practice in South Bend from 1893 to 1925, serving as a prosecuting attorney of St. Joseph County, Indiana from 1896 to 1900 and as city attorney of South Bend from 1918 to 1922.

Federal judicial service

Slick was nominated by President Calvin Coolidge on February 6, 1925, to the United States District Court for the District of Indiana, to a new seat authorized by 43 Stat. 751. He was confirmed by the United States Senate on February 17, 1925, and received his commission the same day. Slick was reassigned by operation of law to the United States District Court for the Northern District of Indiana on April 21, 1928, to a new seat authorized by 45 Stat. 437. His service terminated on September 16, 1943, due to his retirement.

Death

Slick died on January 3, 1959.

References

Sources
 

1869 births
1959 deaths
Judges of the United States District Court for the District of Indiana
Judges of the United States District Court for the Northern District of Indiana
United States district court judges appointed by Calvin Coolidge
20th-century American judges
University of Michigan Law School alumni